"Back That Thing Up" is a song written by Jeremy Stover and Randy Houser, and recorded by American country music artist Justin Moore. It was released in July 2008 as Moore's second single from his self-titled debut album. The song peaked at number 38 on the US Billboard Hot Country Songs chart.

Content
This song uses elements of country rap and country rock as well as sexual innuendo to describe a girl handling equipment on a farm (e.g. "Throw it in reverse, let Daddy load it up").

Critical reception
Kevin John Coyne of Country Universe gave the song a B− grade, stating that he would be "lying if [he] said [he] wasn't disappointed that this isn't a countrified version of the Juvenile hit. Alas, it's just a hillbilly rave-up that finds a country boy trying to get a city girl used to farm life, using backing up a truck as an awkward sexual metaphor" and that Moore "throws himself fully into the lyric like he was Joe Diffie singing a mid-1990s novelty number". In 2017, Billboard contributor Chuck Dauphin put "Back That Thing Up" at number ten on his top 10 list of Moore's best songs.

Music video
The music video was directed by Wes Edwards and premiered in July 2008.

Chart performance
This song debuted at number 55 on the Billboard Hot Country Songs chart for the week of August 23, 2008.

References

2008 singles
2008 songs
Justin Moore songs
Big Machine Records singles
Music videos directed by Wes Edwards
Song recordings produced by Jeremy Stover
Songs written by Jeremy Stover
Songs written by Randy Houser